The Colorado Soccer Association is the governing body of soccer in the state of Colorado. The organization was established in 1978 and the current CEO is Nate Shotts.

References

External links 

 Colorado Soccer Association official site

State Soccer Associations
Soccer in Colorado
1978 establishments in Colorado
Organizations based in Denver
Sports organizations established in 1978